Mohammad Nurul Huda (born 30 September 1949) is a Bangladeshi poet and novelist. Currently Huda is serving as the Director General of Bangla Academy from 12th July 2021.He has written more than fifty poetry books. He was awarded the Ekushey Padak in 2015. Huda was born to Mohammad Sekander and Anjuman Ara Begum in Poak Khali of Cox's Bazar district, Bangladesh on 30 September 1949.

Education

After high school, he studied English Literature at the University of Dhaka and obtained his B. A. with Honors in 1970 and M. A. in 1972. He participated in training courses at the East West Centre, Hawaii. After graduation he taught English in a colleges for about five years and then at the Dhaka University for a brief period. His literary career commenced early and he emerged in the 1960s as a modern poet.

Career

In 2007, after 34 years of service Huda retired as Director of Bangla Academy, Dhaka. Till date he works as the executive editor of the Bangla Academy Journal.  At Bangla Academy, he worked as the Project Director at Young Writers' Project. He also served as the Executive Director of the Nazrul Institute, Dhaka. He was a Consultant of WIPO, Geneva. He is the Departmental Head of English Department in European University of Bangladesh, Dhaka. Also, he contributes a regular column entitled Sadakotha (tr. Plain Tales) on social, political and cultural aspects of contemporary Bangladesh. He is the President of the Bangladesh Writers' Club. The Government of Bangladesh appointed him as the Director General of Bangla Academy on 12th July 2021.

Literary achievements and recognition

Huda is best known as a poet, although he also writes prolifically in several forms. He is particularly acclaimed as jatisattar kobi meaning 'the poet of national identity'. A versatile writer, he is also widely known as an essayist, literary critic, translator, folklorist and intellectual property rights specialist for copyright and traditional cultural expressions.

Huda has translated the poems of the Turkish poet Yunus Emre's poems, in collaboration with Arshaduzzaman, and also translated Nazrul's famous poems entitled 'Kemal Pasha' and 'Wardrum' into English. He was decorated with state honour as an outstanding personality contributing to the promotion of Turkish-Bangladesh relations by Süleyman Demirel, the President of Turkey, during his Bangladesh visit marking the silver jubilee celebration of independence of Bangladesh on 25 March 1997.

Journals and magazines

Journals-Magazines edited and compiled by Huda are as follows:
 Poiema (1980) editor, poetry magazine in English
 Bangla Academy Patrika ( 1983–1992) executive editor
 Studies ( a bulletin on folklore from ICLCS, Dhaka, 1995) editor
 Kobita Club (little magazine, 1995), editor
 Nazrul Institute Patrika (from 1996 August to January 2001)
 Nazrul Institute Journal (from August 1997 to January 2001)
 Bangla Academy Journal (1983–2006 Sept.) executive editor

Awards
 Ekushey Padak Award (2015)
 Bangla Academy Literary Award (1988)
 Poet of International Merit (ISP, 1995)
 Poet of the Year nominated (ISP, Maryland, US, 1995)
 President's Honor from Turkey (1996)
 Mahadiganta Poetry Award (Calcutta), 2007
 Jessore Sahitya Parishad Award (1983)
 Abul Hasan Poetry Prize (1983)
 Alaol Award (1985)
 Awami Shilpa Sangbardhana (1987)
 Cox's Bazar Medal (1989)

Publications

More than 100 titles in total to his credit as of February 2007. Some English titles are -

 Selected Poems (poetry)
 Flaming Flowers : Poets' Response to the Emergence of Bangladesh 
 Nazrul : an Evaluation (edited essays), 
 Poetry of Kazi Nazrul Islam in English Translation (translated and edited with an introduction and notes), 
 Nazrul's Aesthetics and Other Aspects (essays), 
 In Blissful Hell (translation). 
 Wedding and Wild Kite (translation), Bangla Academy Journal (edited)
 Poiema (edited). Nazrul Institute Journal (edited). 
 Methodology : Valuation of Identified TECs of Bangladesh
 Traditional Cultural Expressions (manuscript: 2006)

Poetry
He has published as many as fifty poetry books to his credit till February 2007 as listed below:

 Shonite Somudropath (1972)
 Amar Soshotro Shobdobahini (1975)
 Shobhajatra Dravidar Proti (1975) 
 Ognimoyee He Mrinmoyee (1980) 
 Amra Tamate Jati (1981)
 Shukla Shakuntala (1983)
 Jesus Mujib (1984)
 Nirbachito Kobita (1985) selected poems in Bengali
 Honolulu O Onyananyo Kabita (1987)
 Kusumer Phona (1988)
 Baro Bochorer Golpo (1988)
 Ek Jonome Lokkho Jonmo (1988)
 Galiber Kache Khomaparthonapurbok (1989)
 Ami Jodi Jolodas Tumi Jolodashi (1990)
 Priyankar Jonyo Pongtimala (1992)
 Jatisottar Kobita ( 1992) poems on nationhood
 Yunus Emrer Kobita (1992) translations
 Orokkhito Somoy (1993)
 Telapoka (1993) rhymes
 Bhindeshi Premer Kobita (1993) translations
 Bhalobasar Bukpokete (1994)
 Digonter Khosa Bhenge (1994)
 Premer Kobita (1994) love poems
 Lesbian Clouds and Other Poems (1994)
 Bangla Academy Choraye Bornomala (1994) rhymes,
 Priyo Pangtimala (1995),
 Amar Kopaleo Somoyer Bhaiphonta (1995),
 Mouladhunik (1995),
 Mujibbari (1996),
 Amar Churanta Shobdo Bhalobasa (1998),
 Dekha Hole Eka Hoye Jai (1998),
 Sicorax (1999),
 Adishto Hoyechhi Ami Dirgho Jagorone (1999),
 Smiritiputra (1999),
 Hazar Kobita (2000) One Thousand Poems collected,
 Kabyo Somogra (2001) Collected Poems,
 Darianogor Kabyo (2001),
 Swadhinatar Chora (2001) rhymes,
 Pakhir Chora (2001) rhymes,
 Satbhai Chompa (2001) rhymes,
 Rajar Poshak (2001) rhymes,
 Chander Buro Chander Buri (2001) rhymes,
 Byangkumar (2001) rhymes,
 Selected Poems (2003),
 Padmaparer Dheusoar (2004),
 Sursomudro (2005),
 Punyobangla (2005),
 Quorankabyo (2005) (Translation of Ampara in verse),
 Somoi Maranor Golpo (2006),
 Ami Ekti Khas Prajapatra Chai (2007).

Essays, researches and narrative prose
 Shortoheen Shorte (1981) essays on literature and aesthetics, 
 Lokkhon Songhita (1982) Homoeopathic Matera Medica,
 Bhesojo Udbhid (1982),
 Flaming Flowers : Poets' Response to the Emergence of Bangladesh (1994) essay,
 Rabinroprokriti O Onyanya Probandha (1988) Essays on literature and aesthetics,
 Sartre O Onyanya Prosongo (1993) literary essays, 
 Praner Minar Shahid Minar (1994) prose description for juvenile,
 Srishtishilota O Onnanya (1999) essays,
 Nazrul's Aesthetics and Other Aspects (2001) essays,
 Nandonik Nazrul (2001) essays on Nazrul,
 Monpoboner Nao (2005) travelogue,
 Identification, Valuation and Intellectual Property Protection of Traditional Cultural Expressions of Bangladesh ( A draft report of about 500 pages submitted to WIPO, Genva in January 2005),
 Methodology : Valuation of Identified TECs of Bangladesh. Trial pint 2006, Lokbangla, Dhaka.

Fiction, travelogue and prose
 Mohanobi (1983) biography for children,
 Jonmajati (1994) novel based on history and legends,
 Bastuhara (1994) a novel based on Flannery O'Connor's story,
 Moinpahar (1995) a novel based reality and legends,
 Chotoder Nazrul Jibani (2001) biography for children,
 Chotoder Rabindra Jibani (2001) biography for children,
 Chotoder Begum Rokya (2001) biography for children,
 Chotoder Jibanananda Das (2001) biography for children,
 Chotoder Michael Madhusudan Datta (2001) biography for children,
 Monpoboner Nao (2005) travelogue

Translation
 Poribortaner Pothe (1972) essay,
 Agamemnon (1987) drama,
 In Blissful Hell (1993) novel,
 Flannery O'Connorer Golpo (1997) stories,
 Romeo Juliet (1998) Shakespeare's story retold,
 Neel Somudrer Jhor (1998) Shakespeare's story retold,
 Wedding and Wild Kite (2001),
 Hason Raja (Subtitles of a film, 2001).

Books edited and compiled
 Kobi Madhusudhan (1984) editor, collection of essays,
 Kovita 1390 (1984) editor, collection of poetry,
 Shahid Buddhijibi Sharane Kobitaguccha (1984) editor, collection of poetry,
 Humayun Kabir Racanabali (1984) editor, collected works of Humayun Kabir,
 Kobita 1391 (1985) editor, collection of poetry,
 Abul Hasaner Ogronthito Kobita (1986) one of the three editors of Abul Hasan's poetry collection,
 Bangladesher Nirbacita Kobita (1988) editor, Selected Poems from Bangladesh,
 Homoeopathy Paribhasha (1989) one of the two compilers,
 Kobita : GonoAndolan (1991) editor, collection of poetry,
 Tales to Tell (1991) editor and compiler of a supplementary Reader in English for secondary level,
 Stories for the Young (1991) editor and compiler of a supplementary Reader in English for secondary level,
 Bangla Academy English-Bengali Dictionary (1993) a compiler,
 Shotabdir Sreshtho Premer Pongkti (1995) editor, best love poems of the century,
 Songkhipto Bangla Obhidhan (1995), a compiler of this dictionary,
 Jatiya Prjaye Nazrul Janmabarshiki Udjapan Smarakgrantha 1996 (1996),
 Nazrul : An Evaluation (1997),
 Nazrul Sangeeter Swaralipi Sangkalan (1997),
 Adi Rekordbhittik Nazrul Sangeeter Bani Sangkalan (1997),
 Nazruler Nirbachito Prabandha (1997),
 Nazruler Harano Ganer Khata (1997),
 Poetry of Kazi Nazrul Islam in English Translation (1997)
 Nazrul Barshapanji (1998, 1999),
 Janmashatabarshe Nazrulke Nibedita Kabita (1999),
 Nazruler Maktab Shahitya (2001),
 Nazruler Langal (2001),
 Shatabdir Shreshtho Premer Kabita (Love poems edited, 2005),
 Religious Study (English translator) for Class VI and V (2006, Bangladesh Text Book Board).

Work on intellectual property

Huda has been working on matters relating to intellectual property since last few years. On 12 December 2007 he presented a seminal work at the Top Level Forum on Intellectual Property organised by the World Intellectual Property Organization (WIPO/OMPI), held in Geneva, Switzerland. The main focus of his paper was Traditional Knowledge (TK) and Traditional Cultural Expressions (TCE). He presented an estimation of the value of yearly transaction TCE in Bangladesh.

References

Bangladeshi male poets
Bengali male poets
Bengali-language poets
Bengali–English translators
1949 births
Living people
Recipients of the Ekushey Padak
Recipients of Bangla Academy Award
Recipients of Mazharul Islam Poetry Award